The Ministry of Justice and Human Rights of Peru is the government ministry charged with advising the President of Peru in judicial matters.

The ministry is responsible of the national prison system as well as the state's relationship with the Roman Catholic Church in Peru.

, the minister of justice is José Tello Alfaro.

List of ministers

Ministers of Foreign Affairs, Justice and Ecclesiastical Affairs (1845–1852)

Ministers of Justice, Instruction, Charity and Ecclesiastical Businesses (1852–1856)

Ministers of Justice, Instruction and Charity (1856–1862)

Ministers of Justice, Instruction, Worship and Charity (1862–1896)

Ministers of Justice, Instruction and Worship (1896–1911)

Ministers of Justice, Instruction, Worship and Charity (1911–1935)

Ministers of Justice and Worship (1935–1942)

Ministers of Justice and Labor (1942–1949)

Ministers of Justice and Worship (1949–1981)

Ministers of Justice (1981–2011)

Ministers of Justice and Human Rights (2011–)

Public offices 

General Archive of the Nation (Peru)
National Superintendent of Public Registration (Peru)
National Penitentiary Institute (Peru)

See also
Council of Ministers of Peru
Justice ministry
Ministro de Justicia y Derechos Humanos del Perú (Minister of Justice and Human Rights of Peru)
National Police of Peru

External links
Ministerio de Justicia (Official site – Spanish)

References

Justice
Peru
Peru